Rahim Bakr  is a former Iraqi football midfielder who played for Iraq between 1988 and 1989.

Bakr played for Al-Mina'a, Al-Ittihad and Al-Bahri, after retiring, he worked as a coach at the Basra Specialized Spherical School.

References

Iraqi footballers
Iraq international footballers
Living people
Al-Mina'a SC players
Al-Bahri players
Al-Ittihad SC players
Association football midfielders
Basra
People from Basra
Sportspeople from Basra
Year of birth missing (living people)